Patrick Tam Kar-ming (born 25 March 1948) is a Hong Kong film director and film editor. He is known as the seminal figure of Hong Kong New Wave and the mentor of Wong Kar-wai.

Career 
Tam directed the 1987 film Final Victory, scripted by Wong Kar-wai. He edited Wong Kar-wai's Days of Being Wild, contributing the cameo appearance of Tony Leung Chi-wai in the last scene, and Ashes of Time, as well as Johnnie To's Election.

As part of Hong Kong's New Wave of film directors in the late 1970s and 1980s, Tam's work enjoys great acclaim. According to the Hong Kong film critic Perry Lam, writing in Muse magazine, "[Tam's] unpredictable digressions and swift changes of scene can evoke a dreamer's logic, but his sound and images are always sharp and particular."

Tam is now an associate professor at the School of Creative Media, City University of Hong Kong.

Filmography

Films 
 1980 The Sword (director)
 1981 Love Massacre (director)
 1982 Nomad (director)
 1984 Cherie (director)
 1987 Final Victory (director)
 1988 Burning Snow (director)
 1989 My Heart Is That Eternal Rose (director)
 1990 Days of Being Wild (editor)
 1994 Ashes of Time (editor)
 2002 Dare Ya! (editor)
 2005 Election (editor)
 2006 After This Our Exile (director, film editing supervisor)
 2014 That Demon Within (editor)
 2020 Septet: The Story of Hong Kong (director, segment "Tender Is the Night")

See also
Cinema of Hong Kong
Cinema of mainland China

References

External links

Faculty Listing at the School of Creative Media

 

1948 births
Hong Kong film directors
Living people